The Lee–Speed rifle was a bolt-action rifle based on James Paris Lee's rear-locking bolt system and detachable magazine.  Early models were fitted with barrels using the radiused rifling designed by William Ellis Metford. while later models used the same square "Enfield" rifling as contemporary British military rifles.

The weapon was a sporting variant of the well known Lee–Metford and Lee–Enfield rifles made for civilian shooters, though often purchased by Army officers who wanted a rifle made to a higher standard of fit and finish than the issued military rifle.

Variants

No.1
Officers pattern, with bayonet mount.

No.2
Officers pattern, without bayonet mount.

No.3
Trade pattern.

References

Bolt-action rifles of the United Kingdom
History of the London Borough of Enfield
World War I British infantry weapons
World War II infantry weapons of the United Kingdom
Victorian-era weapons of the United Kingdom